Ptycta is a genus of common barklice in the family Psocidae. There are more than 150 described species in Ptycta.

See also
 List of Ptycta species

References

Psocidae
Articles created by Qbugbot